Clam Dip & Other Delights is the 1989 EP from Minneapolis rockers Soul Asylum. The title and cover art are both parodies of Herb Alpert and the Tijuana Brass's album Whipped Cream & Other Delights. It was a humorous nod to their new record label, A&M (the "A" standing for "Alpert"). Bassist Karl Mueller sat in for the original album's model, Dolores Erickson. Dave Ayers, the band's first manager, said that Mueller had to sit for hours in a foul-smelling combination of sour cream, paint, whipped cream and seafood. Also, the album makes fun of the A&M logo being under the title of the album, incorporating the Twin/Tone Records logo instead.

The EP originally was released in Britain featuring three covers: Foreigner's "Juke Box Hero," Janis Joplin's "Move Over" and "Chains," by an obscure Minneapolis group called the Wad. Only "Chains" was included on the American release.

The song "P-9" was written to benefit striking Hormel workers in Austin, Minnesota.

It is currently in print on Rykodisc Records.

Track listing
"Just Plain Evil" – 3:01
"Chains" – 3:18
"Secret No More" – 2:43
"Artificial Heart" – 3:37
"P-9" – 2:32
"Take It To the Root"  – 3:38

References

Soul Asylum albums
1989 EPs